JDS Nagatsuki (DD-167) was the fourth ship of Takatsuki-class destroyerss. She was commissioned on 12 February 1970.

Construction and career
Nagatsuki was laid down on March 2, 1968 at Mitsubishi Heavy Industries Nagasaki Shipyard & Machinery Works as No. 2307, a 3,000-ton type A II guard ship planned for 1966 based on the Second Defense Build-up Plan, and was laid down in 1969. Launched on March 19, 1970, commissioned on February 12, 1970, it was incorporated into the 3rd Escort Group as a ship under direct control and deployed to Maizuru. Since then, the homeport has not changed from Maizuru.

In 1976, he participated in a practicing voyage to the ocean with the training vessel JDS Katori, and at that time, participated in the observing ceremony of the 200th anniversary of the founding of the United States in New York.

On June 15, 1982, a US-1 flying boat belonging to the 31st Fleet Air Group, which was undergoing water landing training off the coast of Cape Ashizuri, broke the left float at the time of landing and was unable to take off water and drifted, so it was being trained nearby. The ship was towed and returned to Iwakuni base.

On March 30, 1984, the 2nd Escort Corps was newly formed under the 3rd Escort Corps group and incorporated with JDS Mochizuki.

In 1986, he participated in a practicing voyage to the ocean, at which time he participated in the International Fleet Review Ceremony for the 100th Anniversary of the Statue of Liberty in New York.

On January 25, 1989, the 2nd Escort Corps was reorganized under the Maizuru District Force.

From June to November 1994, participated in a training voyage to North America with the escort vessels JDS Takatsuki, JDS Mochizuki, and JDS Shirayuki as the flagship of the training fleet. For this reason, a wood grain sheet was attached to the equipment of the salute (removed after the end) and the equipment panel of the officer's room.

Decommissioned on April 1, 1996.

On August 3, 1997, it was sunk on the training sea surface north of Wakasa Bay by bombardment by JS Hiei and JDS Takatsuki, and JS Natsushio.

The bell that was installed on this ship was the bell that was installed on the former Navy Mutsuki-class destroyer Nagatsuki that was stranded in the Bennett cove, Kolombangara Island. It was dismantled in Nagatsuki after the war, but the bells were kept by the locals at that time, and then the ones brought back to Japan were handed over to the Maritime Self-Defense Force by the efforts of the then general manager of the Kure district, Tatsuo Chikudo, in November 1970. It was equipped on the ship on the 17th of March.

After the ship's retirement, both the Nagatsuki's bell are both preserved at the Maizuru Navy Memorial Hall.

Gallery

Citations

References 

 石橋孝夫『海上自衛隊全艦船 1952-2002』（並木書房、2002年）
 『世界の艦船 増刊第66集 海上自衛隊全艦艇史』（海人社、2004年）
 『世界の艦船 第750集』海人社、2011年11月号

1969 ships
Takatsuki-class destroyers
Ships built by Mitsubishi Heavy Industries